Siti Kasim is a Malaysian human rights lawyer and activist. She came to national prominence with her work within the Human Rights Committee of the Malaysian Bar highlighting the issues being faced by the indigenous peoples of Malaysia. Her work has since grown to encompass defending the rights of other minority and marginalised communities of Malaysia, and championing the ideal of an inclusive and progressive Malaysian society. She has spoken of the criticism and abuse directed at her due to her outspoken and unapologetic demeanour.

2022 Malaysian general elections

Siti Kasim launched her political career at the 15th general elections of Malaysia as an independent candidate aligned with the Gerak Independent movement. Tracing the root of the malaise within the Malaysian political and social landscape to excessive intertwining of government and religious affairs, she has made the separation of state and religion a key pillar of her campaign. She is contesting the parliamentary constituency of Batu against nine other candidates.

References 

1963 births
Living people